"Once in a While" is a popular song, written by Michael Edwards with lyrics by Bud Green. The song was published in 1937.  The song is a much-recorded standard.

Popular recordings
Tommy Dorsey's recording in 1937 went to number one in the United States.
One of the best-known recordings was made by Patti Page in 1952 (on Mercury 5867). 
The song was revived in doo-wop style by the Chimes in 1960, and their version peaked at number eleven on the Billboard Hot 100 in January 1961.

Other recordings

Popular culture
At the end of the instrumental "Stucco Homes" on the third volume of Frank Zappa's 1981 album Shut Up 'n Play Yer Guitar, drummer Terry Bozzio sings the hook of this song.

See also
List of 1930s jazz standards

References

1937 songs
Tommy Dorsey songs
Patti Page songs
The Chimes songs
Elkie Brooks songs
Songs with lyrics by Bud Green
1930s jazz standards